The Missouri River 340, or MR340, is a 340 mile kayak and canoe race from Kansas City, Kansas to St. Charles, Missouri that follows the Missouri River. It is the longest continuous canoe and kayak marathon in North America besides the Yukon 1000, and possibly the world.

Checkpoints
Start: Kaw Point, Kansas City, Kansas
 CP1: Lexington, Missouri
 CP2: Waverly, Missouri
 CP3: Glasgow, Missouri
 CP4: Wilson's Serenity Point at Noren Access (Jefferson City)
 CP5: Hermann, Missouri
 CP6: Klondike, Missouri

End: St. Charles, Missouri

Winners

Records

Dragon Boat (10+)

Men's Solo

Men's Tandem

Mixed Tandem

Mixed Team Division (3-4 paddlers, at least 50% female)

Stand Up Paddleboard (SUP)

Tandem Pedal Drive

Team (3-4)

Team (3-6)

Team Pedal Drive

Voyageur (5-9)

Women's Solo

Women's Tandem

Most Solo Finishes
(5) Marek Uliasz  (2006, 2007, 2008, 2009, 2010)

Most Finishes
(5) Katie Pfefferkorn  (2006, 2007, 2008, 2009, 2010) 
(5) Di McHenry  (2006, 2007, 2008, 2009, 2010) 
(5) Marek Uliasz  (2006, 2007, 2008, 2009, 2010) 
(5) West Hansen  (2006, 2007, 2008, 2009, 2010) 
(5) Chuck McHenry  (2006, 2007, 2008, 2009, 2010)

References

External links
 Official website

Canoeing and kayaking competitions in the United States
Missouri River
Sports in Missouri
Sports competitions in Missouri
Sports in Kansas
Sports competitions in Kansas